The Type 96 and Type 97 were Japanese 150 mm calibre mortars used during the Second World War.  The Type 96 designation was given to this mortar as it was accepted in the year 2596 of the Japanese calendar (1936). It had a caliber of 150.5 mm. The Type 96 was used in Iwo Jima and China, but its performance is not known. In 1941 the weapon was developed into the more portable Type 97 150 mm Mortar, which simply has the recoil absorber removed. Approximately 90 Type 96 mortars and 110 Type 97 mortars were produced in total.

Specifications

References

Notes

Bibliography
 US War Department Special Series No 30 Japanese Mortars and Grenade Dischargers 1945

External links
http://www3.plala.or.jp/takihome/mortar.htm#96

Infantry mortars of Japan
150 mm artillery
World War II mortars of Japan
Military equipment introduced in the 1930s